Chilaka Gorinka is a 1966 Indian Telugu-language film produced and directed by K. Pratyagatma. The film won the Nandi Award for Best Feature Film from the government of Andhra Pradesh. Sri Sri wrote the lyrics for the film, while S. Rajeswara Rao provided the music score. This is the debut film for actor and politician Krishnam Raju and also the Telugu debut for the all-time comedian Rama Prabha.

Plot

Cast

Chadalavada as Nawabu

Songs

Accolades 
Nandi Award for Second Best Feature Film - Silver won by Kotayya Pratyagatma.

References

External links

1966 films
1960s Telugu-language films
Indian romantic drama films
1966 romantic drama films
Films scored by S. Rajeswara Rao
Indian black-and-white films
Films directed by Kotayya Pratyagatma